Mount Airy station is a SEPTA Regional Rail station at 119 East Gowen Avenue between Devon and Sprague Streets, Philadelphia, Pennsylvania. The station building is listed on the National Register of Historic Places and was built in 1875 with Frank Furness as the likely architect, according to the Philadelphia Architects and Buildings project. The National Register of Historic Places Nomination Form lists the architect as unknown, but notes the similarities to the nearby Gravers station which was designed by Furness.  Both stations display an aggressively styled roofline in the Queen Anne Stick Style.  The Mount Airy station's roof is described as "combining hipped, gabled, jerkinhead designs with a double splayed profile" and the Graver's Lane Station might be considered even more aggressive.

The station is in zone 2 on the Chestnut Hill East Line, on former Reading Railroad tracks, and is 9.3 track miles from Suburban Station. In 2013, this station saw 193 boardings and 159 alightings on an average weekday.

A used book store formerly occupied much of the station building.

Station layout

References

External links

SEPTA – Mt. Airy Station
Older and 2005 Mount Airy RDG Station images
 Gowen Avenue entrance from Google Maps Street View
 Station House from Google Maps Street View

SEPTA Regional Rail stations
Former Reading Company stations
Railway stations on the National Register of Historic Places in Philadelphia
Frank Furness buildings
Railway stations in the United States opened in 1875
Mount Airy, Philadelphia